Emma Louise King (born 25 March 1992) is an Australian former cricketer who played as a right-arm off-break bowler and right-handed batter. She played domestic cricket for Western Australia from her debut in the 2009–10 season. In the 2013–14 Australian Women's Twenty20 Cup, she was the leading wicket-taker with 13 wickets which included a performance of 4/9 against the New South Wales Breakers. More recently she claimed six wickets in the 2016-17 WNCL tournament.
She also played for the Perth Scorchers in both the first season and second season of the Women's Big Bash League Twenty20 competition.

, King was employed as a physical education teacher at St Hilda's Anglican School for Girls in Mosman Park, a suburb of Perth.

In November 2018, she was named in the Perth Scorchers squad for the 2018–19 Women's Big Bash League season.

On 20 March 2021, King announced her retirement from professional cricket.

References

External links

Emma King at Cricket Australia

1992 births
Australian women cricketers
Cricketers from Perth, Western Australia
Living people
Perth Scorchers (WBBL) cricketers
Sportswomen from Western Australia
Western Australia women cricketers